This is a list of seasons played by Chonburi Football Club in Thai football, from 2002, when the club founded. This list details the club's achievements in all major competitions, and the top scorers for each season.

Chonburi is a football club from city of Chonburi established from the football club of Assumption College Sriracha. They first participated in the Football Cup. Later, the club was cooperated with Sannibat-Samutprakan (Division 1 team) and named as Chonburi-Sannibat-Samutprakan.

In the year 2002, The club joined the Thailand Provincial League in the name of Chonburi Code Red after separated from Sannibart Samutprakarn FC. The club had the nickname as The Sharks and changed their logo in 2003 season accordingly.

In 2005 they won the Provincial League title by beating Nakhon Ratchasima at the Central stadium, Nakhon Ratchasima, and moved to Thai League T1 in the 2006 season with the Provincial League runners up, Suphanburi. The shark tribes finished 8th place in the Thai League 2006 season.

In 2006 they were invited to play in the Singapore Cup and reached the final, defeating local sides Home United, Albirex Niigata and Balestier Khalsa along the way. In the final they lost to Tampines Rovers 2-3 in the extra time after leading 2-0.

In 2007 they were again invited to participate in the Singapore Cup, but were defeated in the first round against Balestier Khalsa, in a replay of the previous season's semi-finals. Chonburi lost 3-2 in normal play. They have formed links with Manchester City.

Chonburi played in the first AFC Champions League in 2008 with the drawn against Japanese champions Gamba Osaka. On March 20, 2008 the club achieved its first victory in the AFC Champions League against the highly fancied Melbourne Victory.  The game was clouded by controversy when Melbourne Victory scored their only goal whilst a Chonburi FC player was down injured and his teammates were calling for the ball to be played off the park. It mattered little when Cameroonian striker Baga scored a goal from 35 yards out and then followed it up with a second goal in extra time to condemn the Melbourne Victory to their first loss in the competition 3-1.

Seasons

P = Played
W = Games won
D = Games drawn
L = Games lost
F = Goals for
A = Goals against
Pts = Points
Pos = Final position

PRO = Provincial League
TPL = Thai League T1

QR1 = First Qualifying Round
QR2 = Second Qualifying Round
QR3 = Third Qualifying Round
QR4 = Fourth Qualifying Round
RInt = Intermediate Round
R1 = Round 1
R2 = Round 2
R3 = Round 3

R4 = Round 4
R5 = Round 5
R6 = Round 6
GR = Group Stage
QF = Quarter-finals
SF = Semi-finals
RU = Runners-up
S = Shared
W = Winners

External links
 Chonburi FC Official Website

 
Chonburi F.C.